Chumar or Chumur is a village and the centre of nomadic grazing region located in south-eastern Ladakh, India. It is in Rupshu block, south of the Tso Moriri lake, on the bank of the Parang River (or Pare Chu), close to Ladakh's border with Tibet. Since 2012, China has disputed the border in this area, though the Chumur village itself is undisputed.

Geography 

Chumar is along the course of  Pare Chu river, close to Ladakh's border with Tibet. The Pare Chu river originates in India's Himachal Pradesh, flows through Ladakh, and turns southeast near Chumar to flow into what the British called the 'Tsotso district' (now Tsosib Sumkyil Township) in Tibet's Tsamda County. After about 80 miles, Pare Chu reenters Himachal Pradesh again to join the Spiti River.

The Chumar settlement itself is in a side valley of Pare Chu, on the bank of a stream, called Chumur Tokpo that flows down from Mount Shinowu.. There is also a historic gompa (Buddhist temple) near the village and a Chumur monastery further upstream. Along the course of Pare Chu and its tributary streams are numerous pastures and campgrounds utilised by the pastoral nomads of Rupshu. Some of them close to Pare Chu are listed as Sarlale, Takdible, Nirale, Tible, Lemarle and Chepzile.

Chepzile is near a small hamlet called Chepzi which boasts some farmlands. Two tributaries join Pare Chu near the hamlet: the Kyumsalung Panglung (or simply Panglung) stream from the east, and the Chepzilung (or simply Chepzi) stream from the west. The Chepzilung originates below the Gya Peak, a key point on the border between Spiti (Himachal Pradesh) and Tibet.
According to the map drawn by Frederic Drew, who worked as a geologist in the administration of Jammu and Kashmir, these two tributaries were border rivers of Ladakh. The notes to the map he provided state that the subjects of Jammu and Kashmir grazed their cattle in the pasturelands up to the boundary, while the subjects of Tibet did likewise on their side. (Map 2)

Indian boundary definition 

By the time of Indian independence in 1947, the Indians appear to have conceded part of the valley of Chepzilung to the Tibetans. When independent India defined its boundaries in 1954, it also withdrew from the Panglung river east of Chepzi, and set the watershed ridge as the boundary. On the Pare Chu river itself, the Indian-defined border is five miles south of Chumar, which is approximately two miles north of Chepzi. This allows the Tibetan graziers unrestricted access to both the tributary rivers of Pare Chu at Chepzi.

The combined effect of these decisions gave the appearance of a "bulge" in Indian territory near the Pare Chu river. The Indian government justified it on the grounds that the Ladakh's inhabitants had traditionally used the grazing lands along Pare Chu right up to Chepzi.

The people of Chumar claim to have continued to use the farmland and grazing grounds at Chepzi until the recent past.
They say that their access to these lands has been blocked by the People's Liberation Army in recent years.
The local nobility family of Rupshu continues to own the farmland and a palace at Chepzi.
The Indian Army has said that the Chepzi grazing grounds were "beyond the Indian borders."
But the locals are adamant that the Army does not understand their traditional grazing systems.

Chinese claims 
In the 1960 boundary talks with India, China claimed a boundary north of the Indian claim line. However it was still south of the general ridge line running across the Pare Chu valley.

By 2012, China was claiming a boundary further north, representing a "bulge" of its own territory, as shown in the United States Office of the Geographer's boundary datasets. (Map 3)

Sino-Indian border dispute 

Chumar has been one of the most active areas on the Line of Actual Control (LAC) in terms of interactions between Chinese and Indian troops. Located 190 km northwest of Zanda, it had long been an area of discomfort for the Chinese troops as, until 2014, Chumar had been one of the relatively few places along the Sino-Indian border where the Chinese had no roads near the LAC.

According to Phunchok Stobdan, "In Chumar, China probably wants a straight border from PT (point) 4925 to PT 5318 to bring the Tible-Mane area under its control", in essence removing the bulge along the LAC at Chumar. The Chinese opened up this new front of the border dispute in Chumar in 2012, prior to that, the border here was the International Border and not the Line of Actual Control.

As part of the resolution to the 2013 Depsang standoff, the Indian side agreed to take down some bunkers in Chumar in return for the Chinese withdrawing from the Depsang standoff area.

A road from Chumar leads up to the LAC. Along this road near the LAC, there is an Indian post at Point 30R, or known simply as 30R. 30R gets its name from being at a sharp elevation of 30 metres as compared to its surroundings. PLA patrols often come up to 30R. However they are at a tactical disadvantage since vehicles cannot come up to 30R; they have even tried using horses to enter the area. The Chinese have tried constructing a road across 30R, including in 2014 when they claimed they had orders to build a road till Tible, but they have been stopped from doing so by India. During the 2014 standoff here, Chinese troops had also positioned themselves on 30R, and had even heavy machinery with them for road construction. Chinese troops have also been reported to have removed Indian surveillance cameras from the area. The 2014 faceoff at Chumar, which started on 10 September, started days before the Chinese leader Xi Jinping visited India and continued even as he was in India. Indian media quoting army source said that nearly 1000 Chinese soldiers had entered Indian territory in the Chumur sector on the day Xi was in India.

Transport 

Chumar is connected motarable roads to Rayul Lake nearly 50 km in the north, Hanle nearly 100 km in the east, Tso Moriri nearly 60 km north, Meroo on NH-3 nearly 225 km north. 

In 2020, construction of a new ~150 km long road linking Chumar in Ladakh to Pooh in Himachal Pradesh was approved.

See also 
 Parang River
 List of disputed territories of India
 Line of Actual Control
 Demchok sector
 2013 Depsang standoff

Notes

References

Bibliography
 
 Indian Report: ; ; ; 
 Chinese report: ; ; ;

Further reading

External links
 Article about the 2014 Chumar confrontation from Sina Military

Villages in Nyoma tehsil
Borders of Ladakh